resolv.conf is the name of a computer file used in various operating systems to configure the system's Domain Name System (DNS) resolver. The file is a plain-text file usually created by the network administrator or by applications that manage the configuration tasks of the system. The resolvconf program is one such program on FreeBSD or other Unix machines which manages the resolv.conf file.

Purpose
In most Unix-like operating systems and others that implement the BIND Domain Name System (DNS) resolver library, the resolv.conf configuration file contains information that determines the operational parameters of the DNS resolver. The DNS resolver allows applications running in the operating system to translate human-friendly domain names into the numeric IP addresses that are required for access to resources on the local area network or the Internet. The process of determining IP addresses from domain names is called address resolution.

Contents and location
The file resolv.conf typically contains search directives that specify the default search domains used for completing a given query name to a fully qualified domain name when no domain suffix is supplied. For instance, search example.com local.test configures the resolver to try additionally somehost.example.com and somehost.local.test.

It also contains a list of IP addresses of nameservers for resolution. For instance, nameserver 1.1.1.1 configures the resolver to query for the name server with IP 1.1.1.1. Additional nameserver directives after the first are only used when the first or last used server is unavailable. An example file is:

 search example.com local.test
 nameserver 10.0.0.17
 nameserver 10.1.0.12
 nameserver 10.16.0.7

resolv.conf is usually located in the directory /etc of the file system. The file is either maintained manually, or when DHCP is used, it is usually updated with the utility resolvconf.

In systemd based Linux distributions using systemd-resolved.service, /etc/resolv.conf is a symlink to /run/systemd/resolve/stub-resolv.conf.

See also
 Hosts (file)
 nsswitch.conf
 resolved.conf
 systemd-resolved

References

External links
 "resolv.conf" on Arch Linux wiki
 "resolv.conf" on Gentoo Linux wiki
 
 
 

Domain Name System
Configuration files